Shiqiao Station  is a station of Line 3 of the Guangzhou Metro. It started operations on 28 December 2006. It is located at the underground of the junction of Guangming Road North and Qiaoxing Avenue, Shiqiao Subdistrict, in Panyu District, Guangzhou.

Station layout

Exits

References

Railway stations in China opened in 2006
Guangzhou Metro stations in Panyu District